Anton Vasilev (sometimes listed as Anton Vasilyev, born 13 October 1983) is a Russian sprint canoeist who has competed since the late 2000s. He won a gold medal in the K-4 1000 m event at the 2013 ICF Canoe Sprint World Championships in Duisburg and two bronze medals in the K-4 200 m event at the 2007 ICF Canoe Sprint World Championships in Duisburg and in the K-4 1000 m event at the 2011 ICF Canoe Sprint World Championships in Szeged.

Vasilev also finished eighth in the K-4 1000 m event at the 2008 Summer Olympics in Beijing.

References

1983 births
Canoeists at the 2008 Summer Olympics
Canoeists at the 2012 Summer Olympics
Living people
Olympic canoeists of Russia
Russian male canoeists
ICF Canoe Sprint World Championships medalists in kayak